is a railway station on the Gotōji Line in Tagawa, Fukuoka, Japan, operated by Kyushu Railway Company (JR Kyushu).

Lines
Funao Station is served by the Gotōji Line.

Adjacent stations

See also
 List of railway stations in Japan

References

External links

  

Railway stations in Fukuoka Prefecture
Railway stations in Japan opened in 1922